The canton of Taravo-Ornano is an administrative division of the Corse-du-Sud department, Corsica, France. It was created at the French canton reorganisation which came into effect in March 2015. Its seat is in Grosseto-Prugna.

It consists of the following communes:

Albitreccia
Argiusta-Moriccio
Azilone-Ampaza
Campo
Cardo-Torgia
Casalabriva
Cauro
Ciamannacce
Cognocoli-Monticchi
Corrano
Coti-Chiavari
Cozzano
Eccica-Suarella
Forciolo
Frasseto
Grosseto-Prugna 
Guargualé
Guitera-les-Bains
Moca-Croce
Olivese
Palneca
Petreto-Bicchisano
Pietrosella
Pila-Canale
Quasquara
Sampolo
Santa-Maria-Siché
Serra-di-Ferro
Sollacaro
Tasso
Urbalacone
Zévaco
Zicavo
Zigliara

References

Cantons of Corse-du-Sud